The Baotou–Maoming Expressway, designated as G65 and commonly referred to as the Baomao Expressway is an expressway that connects the cities of Baotou, Inner Mongolia, China, and Maoming, Guangdong. When fully complete, it will be  in length.

Currently, many sections of the expressway are still under construction. The sections of the expressways that are complete are:
 From Baotou to the Shaanxi border in Inner Mongolia
 From the Inner Mongolia border to Ankang in Shaanxi
 From Dazhou in Sichuan to Chongqing
 From Guilin to Cenxi in Guangxi

Route
The route passes through the following cities:

Baotou, Ordos, Yulin, Yan'an, Tongchuan, Xi'an, Ankang, Dazhou, Chongqing, Qianjiang, Jishou, Huaihua, Guilin, Wuzhou, Maoming

Due to the challenging terrain the expressway includes numerous tunnels and bridges including the Aizhai Bridge which spans over 1 km.

References

Chinese national-level expressways
Expressways in Inner Mongolia
Expressways in Shaanxi
Expressways in Sichuan
Expressways in Chongqing
Expressways in Hunan
Expressways in Guangxi
Expressways in Guangdong